Tabulaephorus ussuriensis is a moth of the family Pterophoridae. It was described by Aristide Caradja in 1920 and is found in Russia.

References

Moths described in 1920
Pterophorini
Taxa named by Aristide Caradja